Caron Bernstein (born 16 August 1970) is a South African model, actress and singer.

Biography 
Caron Bernstein was born in Johannesburg. She majored in painting while studying at the School of the Arts in Johannesburg. At the age of fourteen, she was awarded a modeling contract with Ford Models. At 23, Bernstein changed her focus from modeling to music, signing three record deals with major labels by the time she was 26.

Bernstein later returned to art, focusing on portraits that attempt to capture the darker aspects of the subject's character. Her work has included victims of suicide, anorexia and alopecia. She has described her style as "surrealistic anime".

Bernstein lives and works in New York City with her husband Andrew Schupak and son Jett.

Filmography 
 Indiscretion (101) (2005) – Kristin
 Operation Midnight Climax (2002) – Kali 'Bondgirl' Bond
 Red Shoe Diaries 18: The Game (2000) (V) – Lily (segment: "The Game")
 Business for Pleasure (1997) – Isabel
 Who's the Man? (1993) – Kelly
 Waxwork II: Lost in Time (1992) – The Master's Girl

Television 
 "Red Shoe Diaries" – Art of Loneliness (1996) (TV episode) – Frances
 "Red Shoe Diaries" – The Game (1994) (TV episode) – Lily

External links 

 Caron's Official Myspace
 @caronbernstein1984 Instagram 

1970 births
Living people
Singers from Johannesburg
South African female models
South African film actresses
South African women singer-songwriters
White South African people
South African Jews
20th-century South African women singers